Weggis landing stage is a ferry port in the municipality of Weggis, in the Swiss canton of Lucerne. It is located on a projection of the Rigi mountain that protrudes into the northern part of Lake Lucerne. It is served by the Lake Lucerne Navigation Company.

Services 
 the following services stop at Weggis:

 Lake Lucerne Navigation Company: hourly service between Luzern Bahnhofquai and Brunnen; some ships continue from Brunnen to Flüelen.

References

External links 
 
 

Ferry terminals in Switzerland
Transport in the canton of Lucerne